He Had a Hat is a 2007 album by jazz pianist Jeff Lorber. All compositions on this album were original, except for "Grandma's Hands" which was originally composed and performed by Bill Withers.

The album, and title track, are named after the punchline of an old Jewish joke about a grandmother whose grandson is saved from drowning in the ocean after she prays to God. The joke was told to Lorber by the album's producer, Bobby Colomby, in the recording studio, and Lorber felt it fit in well with the album's lighthearted mood.

He Had a Hat was nominated for a 2008 Grammy Award for Best Contemporary Jazz Album, losing to Herbie Hancock's River: The Joni Letters.

Track listing 
All songs written by Jeff Lorber and Bobby Colomby, except where noted.
 "Anthem For a New America" - 3:48
 "He Had a Hat" - 4:34
 "Grandma's Hands"; featuring Eric Benét (Bill Withers) - 4:07
 "Surreptitious" - 4:10
 "All Most Blues" - 4:24
 "Orchid"; featuring Chris Botti (Jeff Lorber, Chris Botti) - 3:53
 "Be Bop" - 2:28
 "The Other Side of the Heart"; featuring Eric Benét and Paula Cole - 5:35
 "Hudson" - 3:58
 "Super Fusion Unit" - 3:52
 "Eye Tunes" - 3:50
 "Requiem For Gandalf" - 3:44
 "Burn Brightly" - 3:52
 Bonus Track: "Deep Night" - 3:33

Personnel 
 Jeff Lorber – all keyboards, keyboard solos, horn arrangements (2, 4, 7, 9, 10, 11, 13)
 Paul Jackson Jr. – guitars (2, 3, 4, 8, 10)
 Paul Brown – guitars (3)
 Russell Malone – guitars (13)
 Brian Bromberg – bass (1, 5, 6, 7, 11, 12, 14)
 Alex Al – bass (2, 3, 4, 8, 9, 10, 13)
 Abe Laboriel Jr. – drums (1, 2, 3, 8, 9)
 Dave Weckl – drums (4, 10, 13)
 Vinnie Colaiuta – drums (5, 6, 7, 11, 12, 14)
 Lenny Castro – percussion (2, 9, 10, 12, 13, 14), tambourine (3)
 Kirk Whalum – tenor saxophone (2), horns (2)
 Gerald Albright – alto saxophone (3)
 Ada Rovatti – tenor saxophone (4)
 Tom Timko – saxophone (4, 7, 9, 11, 13)
 Tom Scott – horns (3), horn arrangements (3, 5), alto saxophone (5)
 John Mitchell – bass clarinet (5, 10, 12)
 Bob Sheppard – alto flute (5, 10, 12), flute (5, 10, 12), tenor saxophone (6, 9)
 Jeff Driskill – alto flute (5, 10, 12)
 Hubert Laws – flute (9, 11)
 Steven Durnin – French horn (5, 10, 12)
 Richard Todd – French horn (5, 10, 12)
 Jacques Voyemant – trombone (2)
 Jens Wendelboe – trombone (4, 7, 9, 11, 13), bass trombone (4, 7, 9, 11, 13)
 Bob McChesney – trombone (5, 10, 12)
 Greg Gosnell – bass trombone (5, 10, 12)
 Randy Brecker – trumpet (4), horn arrangements (4)
 Steve Jankowski – trumpet (4, 7, 9, 11, 13), flugelhorn (4, 7, 9, 11, 13)
 Hernan "Teddy" Mulet – trumpet (4, 7, 9, 11, 13), flugelhorn (4, 7, 9, 11, 13), horn arrangements (4)
 Gary Grant – trumpet (5, 10, 12)
 Chris Botti – trumpet (6, 14)
 Bobby Colomby – horn arrangements (7, 9, 11, 13)
 Jeremy Lubbock – orchestrations (1, 8)
 The Krim Symphonic Orchestra – orchestra (1, 8)
 Eric Benét – vocals (3, 8)
 Paula Cole – vocals (8)

Production 
 Bobby Colomby – producer 
 Jeff Lorber – recording, mixing (4, 6)
 Dave Rideau – basic track recording 
 Kevin Killen – guitar recording (13)
 Paul Brown – mixing (1, 2, 3, 5, 7-13)
 Larry Goetz – recording assistant for horns (2, 3, 4, 7, 9, 11, 13)
 Dragan "DC" Capor – mix assistant (1, 2, 3, 5, 7-13)
 Chris Bellman – mastering at Bernie Grundman Mastering (Hollywood, California)
 Eli Wolf – A&R 
 Keith Karwelies – A&R administration 
 Josh Gold – product manager
 Adam Barber – orchestrations 
 Dante DeSilva – music copyist 
 Gordon H. Jee – creative direction
 Carla Leighton – art direction, design 
 Jeff Bender – photography 
 Bud Harner – management at Chapman Management

References

External links
He Had A Hat by Jeff Lorber on lorber.com

Jeff Lorber albums
2007 albums
Albums produced by Bobby Colomby
Blue Note Records albums